Buffalo is an unincorporated community in Coal Township, Jackson County, Ohio, United States. It is located southwest of Coalton, near the intersection of U.S. Route 35 and Jackson Hill Road (County Road 36).

References 

Unincorporated communities in Jackson County, Ohio